West Southbourne is a ward in Bournemouth, Dorset. Since 2019, the ward has elected 2 councillors to Bournemouth, Christchurch and Poole Council.

History 
The ward formerly elected councillors to Bournemouth Borough Council before it was abolished in 2019.

Geography 
The ward covers the western areas of Southbourne. The ward is between Boscombe East and Pokesdown and East Southbourne and Tuckton.

Councillors 
One Labour and one Conservative.

Elections

2019 Bournemouth, Christchurch and Poole Council election

References 

Wards of Bournemouth, Christchurch and Poole